Highway 41 is a highway in the Canadian province of Saskatchewan. It runs from Highway 5 in Saskatoon to Highway 3/Highway 6 in Melfort.

Highway 41 also intersects Highway 2. Also along the route, it passes near the communities of Aberdeen and Wakaw.

Route description

Communities

Aberdeen incorporated as a village in 1907. The village of Alvena has a population of about 55 residents. According to the 2006 census the One Arrow 95-1C Indian Reserve had a population of zero living on their  land allotment. Wakaw is a town which began with the establishment of the Presbyterian Geneva Mission in 1903. In 1992, a memorial was erected in recognition of the Anna Turnbull Memorial Hospital and the Geneva Mission. Melfort, the City of Northern Lights is located in the Carrot River valley. The city was first named the Stoney Creek settlement which changed when the post office in the area was named. Melfort became a village in 1903, a town in 1907, and a city in 1980. The valley area with black loamy soil is prime agricultural lands. Located at Melfort is the Agriculture Melfort Research Station.

Rural municipalities
The rural municipality (RM) of Aberdeen No. 373 is outside of Corman Park 344 which circumnavigates the city of Saskatoon.  The RM of Aberdeen was incorporated July 26, 1909.  Since 1909 one township of the RM was annexed by the RM of Comran Park.  Highway 41 and the Canadian National Railway (CNR) line both support transportation to Aberdeen.  Agriculture is the main economy of the area which provides a base for Horizon Seed Processors, Louis Dreyfus High Throughput Grain Germinal and Hold On Industries.  The main portion of RM Three Lakes No. 400 is south of Highway 41, The RM's name comes from Basin Lake, Lenore Lake and Middle Lake which are fully or partially within the RM area. LID #21-S-2 became Invergordon No. 430 and LID #221-R-2 is now Flett's Springs no. 430.  In 1908 LID #21-S-2 paid to foremen in the area 22 cents per hour, a laborer received 20 cents per hour and a man with team received 40 cents an hour.  An additional 25 cents per day were paid for use of plow when it was needed.  In 1914, rates went up.  A man with team received 50 cents an hour, a man or a team 25 cents an hour and 30 cents an hour for a foreman.  Two slushers and scrapers could be ordered for each district, the quantity dependent upon roads and sloughs in the area.  The rail survey began in 1929 and the Meskanaw bridge construction began.  The Meskanaw station was opened around 1935 and passenger trains continued until 1977.  Technology at this time allowed vehicles open roads through the winter months, and rails went into disuse. Flett's Springs is in a boreal transition ecoregion which has some features of aspen parkland and boreal forest vegetation.  The Flett's Springs School was established as early as 1894.  The community established the Local Improvement District (LID) NO. 21 and 22 in the area as the civic government.  The LID changed names to Carrot River Municipality No. 429 in 1910.  It wasn't until 1938 that the present land holdings and the name of RM of Flett's Spring's No. 419 was in effect.  The area became a part of the Saskatchewan Association of Rural Municipalities (SARM) at the same time.  The RM office is housed in Melfort as of 1989, with the first offices being in Pathlow.

Major Attractions
The Fish Creek Historical Site commemorates Major General Frederick Middleton's camp. The Clarkboro Ferry crosses the South Saskatchewan River near the old ferry crossing which was named Clarke's Crossing. Clarke's Crossing was used by General Middleton's troops when travelling to the Fish Creek Battle en route from North Battleford. There is a marker on the Edenburg road which pays tribute to Clarke's Crossing Ferry service. Flett Creek and Goosehunting Creek both meander through the RM of Flett's Springs. To the north of Melfort is Wapiti Regional Park at Codette Lake. The City of Melfort provides a campground at the highway junction of Highway 3, the CanAm and Highway 41. The historical Melfort power house has been renovated for the Melfort and District Museum.

Route

Inside Saskatoon's eastern city limits, Highway 5 connects with Highway 41 at the site of a small commercial area that, as of 2007, included the Sundown Drive-In, one of Canada's last operational drive-in movie theatres. At Km 2.9, Highway 41 is traveling north east and crosses Llewellin Road, exiting Saskatoon's city limits. The Agra Road intersection is at Km 4.2. Continuing north east, Highway 41 meets with Bettken Road at 9.8 km.  the Intersection with Hwy 27 is at Aberdeen. Alvena can be accessed at Km 40.1. One Arrow 95-1C Indian Reserve is north of the highway at Km 61.9. Travel continues north east arriving at the Highway 22 intersection at Km 78.0. Highway 312 is just north of this intersection meeting with Highway 22. Travel west along Highway 312 will traverse the South Saskatchewan River via the a three span bridge. Travel continues on Highway 41 due east. The town of Wakaw and Wakaw Lake Regional Park are accessed via Highway 2. At Km 95.0, the Highway returns to its north east direction. The village of Reynaud is to the east of this mile point. AT Km 107.8, Highway 41 intersects with Highway 20. Yellow Creek is located at Km 117.8, travel on Highway 41 is due east at this juncture. Meskanaw is located at Km 129.6. Travel along Highway 41 is now due east. There is a curve at Km 138.1 when Highway 41 meets with Highway 776 which continues the due east direction. Highway 41 travels in a north east direction. At Km 148.5, Highway 41 intersects with Highway 368. Highway 3 and Highway 6, the CanAm Highway are traveling south and north as a concurrency when they intersect with Highway 41 south of the city of Melfort.

As of July 2010, several kilometres of Highway 41 were included in a large annexation of land undertaken by the City of Saskatoon.

Major intersections 
From west to east:

Highway 41A

Highway 41A is a spur route of Highway 41 in the Canadian province of Saskatchewan. It runs from Highway 41 to Highway 3 along the western edge of Melfort and serves as part a business loop through Melfort.

Further reading

References

External links

Saskatchewan Road Map RV Itineraries

041